Wyss Institute may refer to:
 Wyss Institute for Biologically Inspired Engineering, at Harvard University in the United States
 Wyss Center for Bio and Neuroengineering, in Switzerland

See also 
 Hansjörg Wyss
 Wyss